Spinal nerve root may refer to:

 Posterior root of spinal nerve
 Anterior root of spinal nerve

Back anatomy
Peripheral nervous system